KUMY-LD (channel 22) is a low-powered television station licensed to Beaumont, Texas, United States. The station transmits from atop the Century Tower in downtown Beaumont, and is an affiliate of NewsNet.

References

Television stations in Texas
Television channels and stations established in 2000
Low-power television stations in the United States